Taghshinny, also written as Tashinny, is a village and parish located in South-East County Longford, Ireland, North-East of Ballymahon. 

The local Church of Ireland is home to the large "Annaly monument". This monument is dedicated to the Gore family who were major landowners in this part of County Longford in the eighteenth century and gained the title Baron Annaly. Their principal residence was Tennelick, which they inherited from the Sankey family, who acquired large estates in Ireland in the seventeenth century, and was just outside Taghshinny.

Taghshinny lies on the R399 regional road.

See also
 List of towns and villages in Ireland

References
 The History of Tashinny Church

Towns and villages in County Longford